is a Japanese video game composer and sound director employed at Bandai Namco Entertainment. He is best known for his work in the Soulcalibur series.

Biography
Growing up, Nakatsuru enjoyed music, playing around with instruments while listening to music on the radio as a boy. His parents provided him with classical piano lessons, and he would always play popular songs with his own arrangements instead of practicing for the lesson. While attending high school, Nakatsuru played the trombone in a brass band, and was a keyboardist and band composer in his private life. He majored in art at the university and studied music theory, acoustics, and desktop music (DTM), although he was more interested in making original songs and playing them in a band.

Musical style and influences
For his work on Soulcalibur, Nakatsuru mostly uses composited music, but sometimes incorporates live orchestral elements into his soundtracks. Commenting on the use of a live orchestra, he notes that it is vital for the scenes with a very emotional presentation and sampled instruments are not enough to express the emotion. On the other hand, he has stated that fierce battle scenes may need speed and tension that can only be done with a computer. He feels that "Audio is a key element in making scenes more evocative and expressive, thereby empathizing with the players in various situations." Nakatsuru has said that the orchestral sound of John Williams' soundtrack to Star Wars: Episode I – The Phantom Menace has deeply influenced him.

Works

References

1969 births
Japanese composers
Japanese male composers
Japanese music arrangers
Living people
Video game composers